
Leah Rose Randi  is an American bass player and vocalist. She has recorded or performed live with bands including Abandoned Pools, Front Line Assembly, Paradise Lost, Delerium, Conjure One and Pink.

Background
Born Leah Rose Randi on September 11, 1970, in Los Angeles, she is the daughter of the musician Don Randi and Norma Waterman.

Career
Randi has performed on Saturday Night Live, The Tonight Show and The Ellen DeGeneres Show as part of Pink's band, playing bass on songs such as "God Is a DJ". 
She also appeared in the music videos "The Remedy" and "Monster" by Abandoned Pools and "Last To Know" and "Try This Live" by Pink. Her vocal work on Front Line Assembly's 2004 album Civilization has been singled out for praise.

In May 2010, she joined fellow musicians Slash, Ace Frehley and Charlotte Caffey and Kathy Valentine of The Go-Go's, among other artists, for a performance benefiting the MusiCares Musicians Assistance Program.

Discography
 Chris Poland – Rare Trax (2000)
 Abandoned Pools – Humanistic (2000)
 Delerium – Chimera (2003)
 Front Line Assembly – Civilization (2004)
 L'Âme Immortelle – Gezeiten (2004)
 Paradise Lost – Forever After (2005)
 Pink – Try This Live (DVD) (2005)
 Conjure One – Extraordinary Ways (2005)
 Delerium – Nuages du Monde (2006)
 Serena Ryder – If Your Memory Serves You Well (2007)
 Fauxliage – Fauxliage (2007)
 Paradise Lost – In Requiem (2007)
 Conjure One – Exilarch (2010)
 Delerium – Mythologie (2016)

References

External links
 Official web site

Living people
1970 births
American women guitarists
Women bass guitarists
21st-century American singers
21st-century American women singers
21st-century American bass guitarists